Younes El Aynaoui was the defending champion but lost in the semifinals to Stefan Koubek.

Koubek won in the final 6–4, 6–4 against Jan-Michael Gambill.

Seeds

  Roger Federer (quarterfinals)
  Albert Costa (second round)
  Younes El Aynaoui (semifinals)
  Yevgeny Kafelnikov (first round)
  Greg Rusedski (withdrew)
  Mikhail Youzhny (semifinals)
  Nicolas Escudé (first round)
  Fabrice Santoro (quarterfinals)
  Jan-Michael Gambill (final)

Draw

Finals

Top half

Bottom half

External links
 2003 Qatar Open draw

Singles